Leptotyphlops is a genus of nonvenomous blind snakes, commonly known as slender blind snakes and threadsnakes, in the family Leptotyphlopidae. The genus is endemic to and found throughout Africa. Eleven species have been moved to the genus Trilepida, and other species have been moved to the genera Epacrophis, Epictia, Mitophis, Myriopholis, Namibiana, Rena, Siagonodon, Tetracheilostoma, and Tricheilostoma.

Description
Most species of Leptotyphlops look much like shiny earthworms. They are generally black, grey, or blackish-brown and their scales give them a segmented appearance. Their common name comes from the fact that their eyes are greatly reduced almost to the point of uselessness, and hidden behind a protective head scale. The species which are called thread snakes are so named because of their very narrow, long bodies.

Behavior
All blind snakes including those of the genus Leptotyphlops are burrowing snakes, spending most of their time deep in loose soil, typically only emerging when it rains and they get flooded out.

Diet
The primary diet of Leptotyphlops is ant and termite larvae.

Species

T) Type species.

References

External links

 
 iNaturalist page

 
Snake genera
Taxa named by Vivian Frederick Maynard FitzSimons